The O'Donnell Building (also known as the Bethuram-O'Donnell Building) is a historic commercial building located in downtown Evansville, Indiana.

Description and history 
It was built in 1900, and is a -story, three bay wide, brick building. The features a decorative parapet.

It was listed on the National Register of Historic Places on July 1, 1982.

References

Commercial buildings on the National Register of Historic Places in Indiana
Commercial buildings completed in 1900
Buildings and structures in Evansville, Indiana
National Register of Historic Places in Evansville, Indiana